The 2022 Eurométropole Tour was the 81st edition of the Eurométropole Tour and the sixth edition since it became a one day race. It was held on 10 August 2022 as part of the 2022 UCI ProSeries calendar. This edition was the race's second in the UCI ProSeries.

Teams 
8 of the 19 UCI WorldTeams, seven UCI ProTeams, and five UCI Continental teams made up the 20 teams that participated in the race. In total, 139 riders started the race.

UCI WorldTeams

 
 
 
 
 
 
 
 

UCI ProTeams

 
 
 
 
 
 
 

UCI Continental Teams

Result

References

Sources

External links 
 

Circuit Franco-Belge
Circuit Franco-Belge
Circuit Franco-Belge
Circuit Franco-Belge